Swaddling Songs is the only studio album released by Irish progressive folk band Mellow Candle.

The album is noted for its multi layered vocal harmonies and complex arrangements. Over time, the album has been regarded a classic of the progressive folk scene.

Track listing

"Heaven Heath" (Alison Williams) – 3:00
"Sheep Season" (Clodagh Simonds, A. Williams, David Williams) – 5:01
"Silversong" (Simonds) – 4:26
"The Poet and the Witch" (Simonds) – 2:51
"Messenger Birds" (A. Williams) – 3:38
"Dan the Wing" (Simonds) – 2:45
"Reverend Sisters" (Simonds) – 4:21
"Break Your Token" (Simonds) – 2:27
"Buy or Beware" (D. Williams) – 3:04
"Vile Excesses" (D. Williams, William Murray) – 3:14
"Lonely Man" (Simonds) – 4:30
"Boulders on My Grave" (Simonds) – 3:40

Bonus tracks

The CD re-issue includes the following as bonus tracks: -

"Feeling High" (Simonds) – 2:23
"Tea with the Sun" (Simonds) – 3:18

These tracks were the original single and B-side released by the young band in 1968.

Single

The track "Silversong" was released as a single with "Dan the Wing" as B-side. The song was also later covered by All About Eve.

Personnel

Clodagh Simonds – lead vocals, backing vocals, piano, harpsichord, mellotron
Alison Williams (Alison Bools) – lead vocals, backing vocals
David Williams – guitar, backing vocals
Frank Boylan – bass guitar, backing vocals
William Murray - drums, percussion

Recording

David Hitchcock – producer
Derek Varnals – engineer
Kevin Fuller – engineer

Versions

vinyl LP (Deram, 1972)
Vinyl LP ADLP1040 (ACME Gramophone Company, 2004)
CD ADCD1040 (ACME Gramaphone Company, 2004)

References

Liner notes to CD ADCD1040 (ACME Gramophone Company, 2004)

1972 debut albums
Mellow Candle albums
Deram Records albums
Albums produced by Dave Hitchcock